Maturana is a surname, and may refer to:

María Pilar López de Maturana Ortiz de Zárate, Blessed (1884-1984), Spanish Catholic religious and founder of the Mercedarian Missionaries of Bérriz 

Carlos Maturana (born 1953), in art Bororo, Chilean artist 
Eduardo Acevedo Maturana (1815-1863), Uruguayan jurist and politician 
Francisco Maturana (born 1949), Colombian ex-football player and football manager
Humberto Maturana (1928–2021), Chilean biologist turned philosopher
Marcos Maturana del Campo (1906-1973), Chilean politician and military
Marcos Segundo Maturana Molina (1830-1892) Chilean military war hero and art collector's fork. 
Nicolás Alexander Maturana Caneo (born 1993), Chilean professional football midfielder
Orlando Maturana Vargas (born 1965), retired Colombian footballer
René Gabriel Maturana Maldonado (1955–2009), Chilean journalist and the 36th Mayor of Pichilemu

Religion
Capilla Maturana in Montevideo, Uruguay
the adjacent Colegio Maturana, held by the Salesians of Don Bosco, in Montevideo, Uruguay